My War is a 2016 Chinese historical war drama film directed by Oxide Pang and starring Liu Ye, Wang Luodan, Huang Zhizhong, Tony Yang, Ye Qing and Wang Longhua. It was released in China by China Film Group Corporation in 3D, IMAX 3D and China Film Giant Screen. As mentioned in the movie, the movie was inspired by Ba Jin's novel "Reunion" ("Tuan Yuan"). An earlier movie "Yingxiong ernu (1937)" was adapted from the same novel.

This movie is an historical drama following the Chinese soldiers in the People's Volunteer Army sent to fight in the Korean War against the US and its allies where they experienced life and death and established profound revolutionary feelings.

Plot
The film begins when a train carrying weapons arrived in a station. The Art Troupe were grouped according to the blood type when the males aboard the arriving train mocked the women, until one of the women answered the group's Captain on the local dialect. Meanwhile, a town militia tried to steal weapons on the supply train but was caught. When the train leaves, he dodged the MPs and hopped on the train. The train was carrying troops of the People's Volunteer Army (PVA) to intervene in Korean War. As they arrive in Yalu River, the train was ambushed by American airstrikes and a fortified fortress, causing casualties on the new volunteers. Only on the tactics of their commander Sun Beichuan, they secured the fortress. Next, they were commanded to delay the US attack on a mountain pass, they suffered casualties before one of them detonated himself on the tank. But upon seeing another convoy, they retreated and commanded a father-and-son duo to plant and detonate explosives on the mountainside. The rubble ensued buried the convoy. The unit was honored for their effort. The unit was composed of PVA and some members of Art Troupe.

While entering an abandoned base, they looted it, but detonated booby traps, wounding some of them. One of them stumbled upon a mine, and the Captain saved her. As the soldiers escape, the Americans ambushed them, intending to take the women alive, Big Daddy sacrificed himself and Wenjun died. The girls, full of rage, threw grenades upon their enemies, but Captain Meng was wounded. They flee, while Big Daddy detonated grenades upon the chasing Americans. Days later, they were again tasked with taking some hills.

As the bombardment upon the American-occupied hills ends, they charged with human waves, suffered casualties, but after they placed artillery, they repelled the defenders.

Cast
Liu Ye as Sun Beichuan / Commander Sun
Wang Luodan as Meng Sanxia / Captain Meng
Huang Zhizhong as Li Shunliang
Tony Yang (credited as Yo Yang) as Zhang Luodong / Little Magician
Ye Qing as Wang Wenjun
Wang Longhua as Liu Shiwen
Guo Jinglin as Tian Yizhuo
Ji Xiaofei as Lao Ziwei
Huo Yijian as Lao Bangzi
Fu Hong as Da Wihu
Wang Qi as Da Fuzi / Big Axe
Lin Yanlin as Lin Meiyu
Liu Yingyi as Xiao Cao
Xu Jiaqi as Xiao Song
Ding Zenghui as Xiao Shanzi

Reception
The film grossed  at the Chinese box office.

The film was not well received in the Republic of Korea, and was considered controversial in mainland China, in part due to its promotional material. in which modern South Koreans are perceived as being disrespected. The controversial advertisement depicted a South Korean tour guide in Seoul, shown as being ignorant if China's involvement in the Korean War, being bombastically lectured by patronizing elderly veterans of the events depicted in the film, boasting of their involvement in the invasion of Korea as they recommend the film to her so she might be better "educated" as to what they are taking about. Further, there was a lack of prominence of any Korean characters in the film despite the movie depicting the events of the Korean War.

See also
The Founding of an Army
The Founding of a Republic
The Founding of a Party

References

External links

Chinese war drama films
China Film Group Corporation films
Films directed by Oxide Pang
Chinese 3D films
2016 3D films
IMAX films
Korean War films